Bujesily is a municipality and village in Rokycany District in the Plzeň Region of the Czech Republic. It has about 70 inhabitants.

Geography
It lies in the Plasy Uplands. The Berounka River forms the northern municipal border, and the Radnický Stream, its right tributary, forms the eastern border. The Bujesilský creek is a short stream that drains the area of the village. The village lies on a plateau above the deep valley of the Berounka. The canyon of the Berounka is lined with forest while the area around the village is mostly forestless.

History
The first written mention of Bujesily is from 1227.

Demographics

Transport
Bujesily is accessible by local road linked to the II/232 Rokycany-Kozojedy road in the village of Liblín.

References

External links

Villages in Rokycany District